The Mapmaker is a 2012 English drama film. Jenny Agutter and Rachel Hurd-Wood play the role of Isabel. Charles Dance and Harry Eden play the role of Rowan.

Plot
When Rowan and Isabel return to the coastline where they spent a blissful summer, almost fifty years before, it is with a very different purpose. Isabel is dying; she wants it to be here, now. As darkness falls, their past collides with the present and Rowan is called upon to make a sacrifice that will preserve their unity forever. Passionate, searing and poetic 'The Mapmaker' examines a life and love that, just like all of ours, is all too fleeting.

Cast
 Jenny Agutter as Isabel
 Charles Dance as Rowan
 Harry Eden as Young Rowan
 Rachel Hurd-Wood as Young Isabel

Reception
The Mapmaker had a successful run on the festival circuit and is critically acclaimed. The film had its international première at The Seattle International Film Festival and its British première at The Raindance Film Festival where it was nominated for Best British Short Film in 2012.

External links
 

2012 films
2012 short films
British drama short films
2012 drama films
2010s English-language films
2010s British films